Ozark Ripley (1872–1940), real name John Baptiste de Macklot Thompson, was an American fisherman and huntsman.

He wrote short stories for pulp fiction magazines such as Adventure.

Books
Jist Huntin': Tales of the Forest, Field and Stream
Quail and the Quail Dog
Modern Bait and Fly Casting

See also
http://fishinghistory.blogspot.co.uk/2008/03/voices-from-past-ozark-ripley.html
http://fultonhistory.com/Newspaper%2018/Troy%20NY%20Times/Troy%20NY%20Times%201934/Troy%20NY%20Times%201934%20-%200777.pdf
https://books.google.com/books?id=fteoggQZNpUC&lpg=PA30&ots=6jszl9Rlzc&dq=%22ozark%20ripley%22%20obituary&pg=PA30#v=onepage&q=%22ozark%20ripley%22&f=false

References

Pulp fiction writers
1872 births
1940 deaths